Taylor Beck may refer to:

 Taylor Beck (ice hockey) (born 1991), Canadian ice hockey player
 Taylor Beck (model), American model and actress